Sea turtle tornovirus 1 is a single stranded DNA virus that was isolated from a turtle with fibropapillomatosis in 2009.

Virology

The genome is circular and ~1.8 kilobases in length with a G+C content of ~50%. It has at least three open reading frames (ORF 1, 2, 3) and two others (ORF 4 and 5) may also be present. The genome is of negative polarity.

ORF 1 possesses a putative nuclear localization signal at its N terminal. ORF 2 has some homology to the viral protein 2 of chicken anaemia virus. ORF 3 has no homology to any known protein. Similarly neither ORF 4 or 5 have any homology with any known protein. The functions of these proteins is not known.

A TATA box (sequence—TATAAA) and a poly adenosine signal (sequence—AATAAA) are present in the genome.

Taxonomy

The final classification of this virus has yet to be decided.

It has a low level of homology to the Circovirus chicken anemia virus.

Clinical

The virus can be isolated from the blood and all the major organs as well as the fibropapilloma.

Genome sequences

Listing: https://www.ncbi.nlm.nih.gov/nuccore?term=EU867816:EU867824[pacc]

References

Single-stranded DNA viruses